Huangdi is a town under the administration of Suizhong County, Liaoning, China. , it administers the following twelve villages:
Donghuangdi Village
Xihuangdi Village
Sangyuan Village
Yulin Village
Xili Village
Dazheng Village
Shangjia Village
Niuxintun Village
Shuanke Village
Sunxiang Village
Xitaitun Village
Yangbaotun Village

References 

Township-level divisions of Liaoning
Suizhong County